The Coen rainbow-skink (Liburnascincus coensis) is an endemic species that inhabits Queensland, Australia.

References

Liburnascincus
Skinks of Australia
Endemic fauna of Australia
Reptiles described in 1953
Taxa named by Francis John Mitchell